West Pennsboro Township is a township in Cumberland County, Pennsylvania, United States. The population was 5,561 at the 2010 census.

History
The John McCullough House was added to the National Register of Historic Places in 1978, though it has been demolished.

Geography
The township is located just west of the geographic center of Cumberland County and is bordered to the east by the borough of Carlisle, the county seat. The borough of Newville is on part of the western border. Conodoguinet Creek, a tributary of the Susquehanna River, forms the northern border of the township, and Big Spring Creek, a tributary of the Conodoguinet, forms most of the western boundary. The southern boundary follows U.S. Route 11.

There are several unincorporated communities in the township. Plainfield, in the eastern part of the township, is a census-designated place. Elliottson, Greason, and West Hill are also in the east. Mount Rock is along US 11 near the center point of the southern border, and Big Spring is near the southwest corner of the township.

Demographics
As of the census of 2000, there were 5,263 people, 1,938 households, and 1,501 families residing in the township.  The population density was 172.6 people per square mile (66.6/km).  There were 2,016 housing units at an average density of 66.1/sq mi (25.5/km).  The racial makeup of the township was 98.71% White, 0.30% African American, 0.15% Native American, 0.30% Asian, 0.02% Pacific Islander, 0.08% from other races, and 0.44% from two or more races. Hispanic or Latino of any race were 0.34% of the population.

There were 1,938 households, out of which 32.5% had children under the age of 18 living with them, 68.2% were married couples living together, 5.8% had a female householder with no husband present, and 22.5% were non-families. 18.3% of all households were made up of individuals, and 9.0% had someone living alone who was 65 years of age or older.  The average household size was 2.65 and the average family size was 3.00.

In the township the population was spread out, with 24.2% under the age of 18, 6.8% from 18 to 24, 27.9% from 25 to 44, 25.7% from 45 to 64, and 15.4% who were 65 years of age or older.  The median age was 40 years. For every 100 females, there were 97.0 males.  For every 100 females age 18 and over, there were 96.0 males.

The median income for a household in the township was $45,873, and the median income for a family was $50,208. Males had a median income of $35,966 versus $24,438 for females. The per capita income for the township was $19,382.  About 6.2% of families and 8.4% of the population were below the poverty line, including 15.4% of those under age 18 and 5.0% of those age 65 or over.

References

External links
West Pennsboro Township official website

Harrisburg–Carlisle metropolitan statistical area
Townships in Cumberland County, Pennsylvania
Townships in Pennsylvania